Maryland Route 76 (MD 76) is a state highway in the U.S. state of Maryland.  Known as Motters Station Road, the state highway runs  from MD 77 in Rocky Ridge north to U.S. Route 15 (US 15) near Emmitsburg in northern Frederick County.  MD 76 was constructed in two sections in the early 1920s and late 1930s.

Route description

MD 76 begins at an intersection with MD 77 (Rocky Ridge Road) in the village of Rocky Ridge.  The roadway continues south as county-maintained Longs Mill Road.  The state highway heads north as a two-lane undivided road that passes over the Maryland Midland Railway and parallels the Monocacy River from a distance.  In the hamlet of Motters, MD 76 intersects Four Point Roads, which leads east to the historic Fourpoints Bridge over Toms Creek, and makes a turn to the west.  The state highway intersects Old Frederick Road and curves to the northwest before reaching its northern terminus at US 15 (Catoctin Mountain Highway) south of Emmitsburg.  The roadway continues west as county-maintained Motters Station Road to St. Anthony Road, the old alignment of US 15 that leads to Mount St. Mary's University and the National Shrine Grotto of Our Lady of Lourdes.

History
The first section of MD 76 was completed by 1921 as a concrete road from US 15 to Motters, a station on the Emmitsburg branch of the Western Maryland Railway.  The highway between Rocky Ridge and Motters was completed in 1938.  Aside from minor improvements, MD 76 has not changed since.

Junction list

See also

References

External links

MDRoads: MD 76

076
Maryland Route 076